Ashan (also known as Āsān) is a village in Sarajuy-ye Gharbi Rural District, in the Central District of Maragheh County, East Azerbaijan Province, Iran. At the 2006 census, its population was 1,268, in 300 families.

References 

Towns and villages in Maragheh County